The 2020–21 Billie Jean King Cup Play-offs was originally scheduled to be held from 17 to 18 April 2020 but was postponed to the following year due to COVID-19. The eight winners of this round will qualify for the 2022 Billie Jean King Cup  Qualifying Round while the eight losers will contest their respective regional Group I event in 2022.

Teams
Sixteen teams will play for eight spots in the 2021 Qualifying Round, in series decided on a home and away basis.

These Sixteen teams are:
 8 losing teams from Qualifying round.
 8 winning teams from their Group I zone.

Eight winners will advance to the 2021 Qualifying Round and eight losers will contest their respective regional Group I event in 2021.

Seeded teams
 
 
 
 
 
 
 
 

Unseeded teams

Results summary

Play-offs results

Poland vs. Brazil

Great Britain vs. Mexico

Serbia vs. Canada

Latvia vs. India

Ukraine vs. Japan

Romania vs. Italy

Argentina vs. Kazakhstan

Netherlands vs. China

References

External links

2020–21 Billie Jean King Cup
Billie Jean King Cup Play-offs
Billie Jean King Cup Play-offs